Taisiya Vital'evna Osipova (Russian: Таисия Витальевна Осипова, born 26 August 1984 in Smolensk) is a Russian opposition activist from the unregistered National Bolshevik Party and  "The Other Russia" party. She is the wife of opposition activist Sergei Fomchenkov.

In 2011 Osipova was sentenced by the Russian courts to 10 years in prison for possession of heroin. In 2012 the sentence was reduced to 8 years in a retrial ordered by a higher court, after President Dmitry Medvedev had called her original sentence "too harsh". Osipova claims the heroin had been planted in a police raid. Mikhail Fedotov, head of Russia's council on human rights, has called the verdict a "legal mistake".

She was released in February 2017.

References

External links
Site about Taisiya Osipova
Article about Taisiya Osipova

1984 births
Living people
People from Smolensk
National Bolshevik Party politicians
Russian political activists
Russian human rights activists
Women human rights activists
Russian dissidents
Russian nationalists
Criminal cases in Russia